Something Else was a Japanese male folk band from Kashiwa consisting of members Nobutaka Okubo, Daisuke Ito and Chihiro Imai. Originally formed as Exit Line in 1994, they later changed their name to Something Else.

They debuted with the song "Kanashiki Nonfiction" in 1996, but remained relatively unknown until they released the song "Last Chance" in 1998.

Members 
 Nobutaka Okubo (大久保伸隆, B. September 24, 1974); Vocals and Acoustic Guitars
 Daisuke Ito (伊藤大介, B. July 25, 1974); Acoustic Guitars and Vocals
 Chihiro Imai (今井千尋, B. August 28, 1974); Bass Guitars and Vocals, who is also the husband of singer Eiko Matsumoto. They have announced on 2007, October 10 that they are expecting their first child.

Discography

Singles

Albums

External links 
 Official Web Site of Something Else (Japanese)
 Official Web Site of Nobutaka Okubo (Japanese)

Japanese rock music groups
Musical groups from Chiba Prefecture